Marwa Rakha (born 1978) is an Egyptian relationship and dating expert. Rakha is a widely cited relationship and advice personality in Egypt and the Arab World, frequently appearing in both print and broadcast media formats, especially talk shows, and she is well known for her controversial views on dating and virginity. Her best-known work is The Poison Tree: Planted and Grown in Egypt.

Career
Rakha graduated from Ain Shams University in 1996 with a degree in English literature. Before becoming a relationship and dating writer, Rakha held a variety of jobs including a receptionist and a marketing director for a hotel chain. In 2005, she began publishing articles while teaching classes at the American University in Cairo. In May 2008, she launched an Arabic radio show and in June she launched an English version. She currently teaches marketing at the American University in Cairo and writes for three English language magazines, one Arabic newspaper and magazine, and two websites. She was interviewed at length about her views on marriage and relationships in the book "Sex and the Citadel".

Views

Rakha is well known in the Arab World for her controversial views on a number of subjects related to relationships and sexual health. She has said "I was brought up to be a good middle class Egyptian girl; but somehow being good did not suit my notions...I could not understand why girls were killed, committed suicide, or lived in eternal shame when they lost their virginity. I failed to comprehend why such a rule applied only to girls and their male counterparts were spared".

Works

The Poison Tree: Planted and Grown in Egypt was released in January 2008. Written in a number of styles, the book covers topics ranging from marriage, divorce, sex, dating, virginity, religion and gender wars.

References

Sources
 "Sex and the Citadel". Anchor, 2014. .
 "The Poison Tree: Planted and Grown in Egypt". Malamih Publishing House, 2008. .

External links
 

Egyptian television presenters
Egyptian women television presenters
Egyptian journalists
Egyptian women journalists
21st-century Egyptian women writers
21st-century Egyptian writers
Living people
Sex educators
1978 births